Hudson Lake is a train stop operated by the South Shore Line in the unincorporated community of Hudson Lake, Indiana.  It is one of a very few interurban stations located in a rural region of the United States, being located approximately halfway between the much larger communities of Michigan City and South Bend. The station is composed of a passenger shelter, a sign, a small concrete pad, and a small parking lot.

Like most interurban railroads of the early 20th century, the Chicago, South Shore and South Bend Railroad was designed to string together farm communities with nearby cities.  Most of these interurban railroads have ended this type of service, and the Hudson Lake station is one of the few such stations that remain.

, the Hudson Lake station is a flag stop.  A customer seeking to board the train here must push a button to activate a flashing strobe light that will catch the attention of the train engineer.   

The Hudson Lake station has a passenger shelter and parking lots on both sides of the tracks (though only the one closest to the station, a small free lot, belongs to NICTD). The station has the shortest platform in the entire South Shore Line, as it is only long enough to berth one train car.

References

External links
 
 South Shore Line - Stations
Station from Chicago Road from Google Maps Street View

South Shore Line stations in Indiana
Railway stations in LaPorte County, Indiana